Steven Lezell Woodrow is a Colorado politician.

Early life
Woodrow spent his early life in Michigan. Woodrow's mother taught public school at Bingham Farms elementary in Michigan.

Education
Woodrow attended the University of Michigan where he majored in political science and earned his B.A., with Distinction, in 2002. During undergrad he served as President of the Alpha-Theta chapter of the Delta Sigma Phi fraternity. Later, in 2005, Woodrow earned a J.D. from the Chicago-Kent College of Law with high honors. During law school he served as President of the Chicago-Kent Student Bar Association.

Career
Woodrow, along with Patrick H. Peluso, co-founded the law firm Woodrow & Peluso. With this firm, Woodrow practices law in Denver, Colorado. In January 2020, Chris Hansen resigned from the Colorado House of Representatives to fill Lois Court's vacancy in the Colorado Senate. While the Democratic Party committee was searching for a replacement, state senator Robert Rodriguez backed Woodrow. Woodrow was appointed to the Colorado House of Representatives seat representing the 6th district, and was seated on February 4, 2020. Due to redistricting, Woodrow was drawn out of the 6th district and placed in the 2nd district. Woodrow won re-election in the 2022 general election.

Woodrow policy focus is on affordable housing, education and gun violence prevention.

Personal life
Woodrow is married and has two children.

Elections

2020
Woodrow defeated challengers Steven Paletz and Dan Himelspach in the Democratic Primary. He went on to win the general election, defeating Republican William McAleb and Libertarian Jeffrey Crowe with 71.9% of the vote.

2022 
Woodrow defeated Republican Stephanie Wheeler and Libertarian Justin Savoy with 74.4% of the vote in the 2022 general election.

References

Living people
Politicians from Denver
Lawyers from Denver
University of Michigan alumni
Chicago-Kent College of Law alumni
Democratic Party members of the Colorado House of Representatives
21st-century American lawyers
21st-century American politicians
Year of birth missing (living people)
Jewish American state legislators in Colorado
21st-century American Jews